McCloud is an English surname, most likely a variant of MacLeod. Notable people with the surname include:

Coyote McCloud (1942–2011), disc jockey in Nashville, Tennessee
David J. McCloud (1945–1998), Lieutenant General in the United States Air Force
Demelza McCloud (born 1980), Australian netball player
George McCloud (born 1967), American former professional basketball player
Kevin McCloud (born 1959), British television presenter
Nick McCloud (born 1998), American football player
Nicole McCloud (born 1958), American singer, also known by her mononym Nicole. Also known as Lillie McCloud, as a contestant in season 3 of the American The X Factor 
Ray-Ray McCloud (born 1996), American football player
Ross McCloud (1819–1868), early settler of northern California
Scott McCloud (born 1960), American cartoonist
TJ McCloud (born 1980), American folk musician
Tyrus McCloud (born 1974), American football player

Fictional Characters
 Fox McCloud, protagonist of Nintendo's Star Fox series.

References

English-language surnames
Patronymic surnames